Anatoli Chekanov (born 13 March 1960) is a former Russian football player.

References

1960 births
Living people
Soviet footballers
Russian footballers
FC Luch Vladivostok players
Russian Premier League players
Association football forwards
FC Smena Komsomolsk-na-Amure players